is a railway station in Taitō, Tokyo, Japan, operated by the private railway operator Keisei Electric Railway. It is the terminus of the Keisei Main Line and is a short distance from JR Ueno Station.

Layout

The station is underground beneath Ueno Park. 

The layout consists of four bay platforms which serve four tracks.

Platforms

History
It was renamed Keisei Ueno Station on 1 May 1953.

Station numbering was introduced to all Keisei Line stations on 17 June 2010. Keisei Ueno was assigned station number KS01.

Passenger statistics
In fiscal 2015, the station was used by an average of 44,814 passengers daily.

Surrounding area
 Ueno Station (JR Lines,  Ginza Line, and  Hibiya Line)
 Ueno Park
 Ueno Zoo
 Tokyo National Museum
 National Museum of Nature and Science
 National Museum of Western Art
 Tokyo Metropolitan Art Museum
 Tokyo Research Institute for Cultural Properties
 Shitamachi Museum
 Ueno Tōshō-gū
 Kan'ei-ji

See also
 List of railway stations in Japan

References

External links

 Keisei Ueno Station map

Railway stations in Japan opened in 1933
Keisei Main Line
Stations of Keisei Electric Railway
Railway stations in Tokyo
Buildings and structures in Taitō